Annie Marie Fuenmayor Fuenmayor (born May 17, 1993) is a Venezuelan model, industrial engineer and beauty pageant titleholder who was selected as Miss Supranational Venezuela 2013. Fuenmayor also represented the Zulian region of Costa Oriental in Miss Venezuela 2015. Similarly, Fuenmayor represented Venezuela in the Miss Supranational 2013 competition, managing to position itself within the Top 20.

Life and career

Early life
Fuenmayor was born in Maracaibo, Zulia. Annie obtained a bachelor's degree in Industrial Engineering, and actually she works as a project manager. She has also studied classical piano.

Pageantry
Annie began her course in the world of beauty pageants by participating in the Reinado de la Feria del Lago 2012, in Maracaibo city, representing the municipality of Santa Inés. The final event was held on October 24, 2012.

Miss Supranational Venezuela 2013 
The following year, Annie was selected to represent Venezuela in the international contest, Miss Supranational.

Miss Supranational 2013 
She represented Venezuela in the Miss Supranational 2013 pageant, which was held on September 6, 2013 at the Minsk Palace of Sports, in Minsk, Belarus. Fuenmayor was able to qualify within the group of 20 semifinalists.

Miss Venezuela 2015 
Annie was selected once again to represent her home region, Costa Oriental, this time at Miss Venezuela 2015.

Controversies 
In 2018, Fuenmayor issued accusations against Giselle Reyes, Miss Venezuela's catwalk teacher, for an alleged prostitution ring on her part.

References

External links
 

1993 births
Living people
Miss Venezuela winners
People from Maracaibo
Venezuelan female models